Mom Has an Affair is a 2020 South Korean television series starring Hyun Jyu-ni, Lee Jae-hwang, Moon Bo-ryung, and Kim Hyeong-beom. It airs on SBS every Monday to Friday at 20:40 (KST) time slot starting 4 May 2020.

Synopsis
Desperate times call for desperate measures and for one mom, that means bagging a rich man to make her kids happy. Pil Jeong is a single, divorced mom of two who swore that she'll never get married again. Her children, on the other hand, have other plans in store. They beg her to find and marry a rich man as a means of securing their family's future and a hilarious family expansion project ensues.

Cast 
 Hyun Jyu-ni as Oh Pil-jung
 Lee Jae-hwang as Kang Seok-joon
 Moon Bo-ryung as 	Lee Eun-joo
 Kim Hyeong-beom as Kang Seok-hwan

References

External links
  
 

Seoul Broadcasting System television dramas
2020 South Korean television series debuts
Korean-language television shows
South Korean suspense television series
Television series by Mega Monster
Television series by Studio S